Elliott M. Rudwick was a professor of Sociology and History as well as an author in the United States. He wrote about African Americans and their history including W. E. B. Du Bois. He corresponded with Du Bois. Rudwick worked with historian August Meier on several books. He also wrote about the East St. Louis riot of 1917.

He graduated from Temple University and received a Master's degree and doctorate from the University of Pennsylvania. Prior to joining the Kent State University faculty in 1968, Rudwick had taught at Southern Illinois University, Florida State University and the University of Tampa.

He was a Guggenheim Fellow. In 1967 he was interviewed about "Negro retaliatory violence".

Bibliography
The Niagara Movement (1957)
Race Riot at East St. Louis; July 2, 1917 (1964)
W. E. B. Dubois; Propagandist of the Negro Protest
Core : A Study in the Civil Rights Movement, 1942 - 1968 with Meier
From Plantation To Ghetto with August Meier
"Fifty Years of Race Relations in East St. Louis: The Breaking Down of White Supremacy"
"Race Leadership Struggle: Background of the Boston Riot of 1903, The Journal of Negro Education, Vol. 31, No. 1 (Winter, 1962), pages 16–24
The Making of Black America; Essays in Negro Life and History (two volumes), edited with August MeierBlack Detroit and the Rise of the UAW with August MeierAlong the Color Line, Explorations in the Black Experience'', edited with August Meier, University of Illinois Press, 1976

References

Year of birth missing
1985 deaths
20th-century American historians
American male non-fiction writers
20th-century American male writers
Temple University alumni
Kent State University faculty
University of Pennsylvania alumni
American sociologists
Southern Illinois University faculty
University of Tampa faculty
Florida State University faculty